Tolon (Toloon) is a rural locality (a selo), the administrative centre of and one of three settlements, in addition to Alysardakh and Innyaly, in Tolonsky Rural Okrug of Lensky District in the Sakha Republic, Russia. Its population as of the 2002 Census was 250.

Geography
The village is located in the Lena Plateau, on the left bank of the Peleduy river,  from Lensk, the administrative center of the district.

References

Notes

Sources
Official website of the Sakha Republic. Registry of the Administrative-Territorial Divisions of the Sakha Republic. Lensky District. 

Rural localities in Lensky District, Sakha Republic